The Vivendi Cup was a one-off European Tour golf tournament which was played from 23 to 26 September 2010 at Golf de Joyenval, Chambourcy near Paris in France. The Vivendi Cup was a 72-hole stroke play tournament, with the first 36 holes played as a team Pro-Am event involving one professional and one amateur over the Retz and Marly Courses at Golf de Joyenval, both designed by Robert Trent Jones. The sponsors for the event were Canal+ and Vivendi.

Winners

References

External links
Coverage on European Tour's official site

Former European Tour events
Defunct golf tournaments in France
2010 establishments in France
2010 disestablishments in France